Black Angels is a 1990 album by the string quartet Kronos Quartet. It includes, and was named after, George Crumb's 1970 composition Black Angels, the composition which had inspired David Harrington to found the Kronos Quartet in 1973.

Track listing

Personnel 
 Hank Dutt – Viola
 Tony Eckert – Engineering (Tracks: A1, A2, B3)
 Bob Edwards – Mixing (Tracks: A1, A2)
 David Harrington – Violin
 Robert Hurwitz – Executive Producer
 Joan Jeanrenaud – Cello
 Juhani Liimatainen – Engineering (Tracks: A1, A2, B3)
 Matt Mahurin – Photography
 John Sherba – Violin
 Judith Sherman – Producer, Engineering, Mixing

See also
1990 in music
Modern classical music

References

External links
Official playlist on YouTube

1990 classical albums
Kronos Quartet albums
Nonesuch Records albums
1990 albums